Khuwaja Sohail Mansoor (born 2 February 1960) is a Pakistani politician who had been a member of the National Assembly of Pakistan, from 2008 to May 2018.

Early life
He was born on 2nd February 1960.

Political career

He was elected to the National Assembly of Pakistan as a candidate of Muttahida Qaumi Movement (MQM) from Constituency NA-240 (Karachi-II) in 2008 Pakistani general election. He received 67,799 votes and defeated Abdullah Boloch, a candidate of Pakistan Peoples Party (PPP).

He was re-elected to the National Assembly as a candidate of MQM from Constituency NA-240 (Karachi-II) in 2013 Pakistani general election. He received 87,805 votes and defeated Naz Baloch.

He ran for the seat of the National Assembly from Constituency NA-239 (Korangi Karachi-I) as a candidate of MQM in the 2018 Pakistani general election, but was unsuccessful. He received 68,811 votes and lost the seat to Akram Cheema, a candidate of the Pakistan Tehreek-e-Insaf (PTI)

On 5 February 2023, he joined the Pakistan People's Party (PPP).

He is the PPP candidate for the 2023 by-election in NA-256 (Karachi Central-IV).

References

Living people
Muttahida Qaumi Movement politicians
Pakistani MNAs 2013–2018
Politicians from Karachi
Pakistani MNAs 2008–2013
1960 births